The Colegio Vista Hermosa (CVH; "Vista Hermosa School") is a private school in Cuajimalpa, Mexico City. The school serves levels preschool to high school (preparatoria).

The school offers programs in conjunction with the International Baccalaureate, including the IB Diploma Programme and the IB Middle Years Programme. It also provides the national education programme in association with the Secretariat of Public Education and the  National Autonomous University of Mexico.

The school has approximately 2,600 students, 180 teachers, 45 maintenance and cleaning personnel, 23 food service personnel, 15 accounting personnel and 130 transport staff.

List of subjects 
 Chemistry (IB and UNAM)
 Physics (IB and UNAM)
 Mathematics (IB and UNAM)
 Biology (IB and UNAM)
 English (IB and UNAM)
 Spanish (IB and UNAM)
 French
 Physical education
 Visual arts (IB and UNAM)
 Cinema (IB and UNAM)
 Theatre (IB and UNAM)
 Computer technology
 Design technology
 Logics
 Drawing
 Geography
 Social studies
 Methodology
 Anatomy
 Anthropology (IB and UNAM)
 Psychology (IB and UNAM)
 Greek etymology
 Constructive drawing
 Applied informatics
 Mexican law
 Theory Of knowledge
 Sociology
 Accounting
 Economic geography
 Social problems
 Theology
 Education in faith

Notable Alumni:
Carlos Esparza

*Note: Some subjects may be missing and other subjects may have been removed

References

External links
 Colegio Vista Hermosa 

High schools in Mexico City
Cuajimalpa
Private schools in Mexico